Pastria pastria is a butterfly of the family Hesperiidae. It is widespread in the mountains of New Guinea, including its type locality, the Mambara River on Mount Kaindi in Papua New Guinea. There are no definite records from Western New Guinea.

References

Taractrocerini
Lepidoptera of New Guinea
Endemic fauna of New Guinea
Butterflies  described in 1949
Taxa named by William Harry Evans